The 10 cm Gebirgshaubitze M 99 was a mountain howitzer used by Austria-Hungary during World War I.

It consisted of a barrel of the 10 cm Feldhaubitze M 99 made from the so-called steel bronze (92% copper bronze strengthened by autofrettage which was used due to the lack of steel industry in Austria, see Franz von Uchatius) on a new, narrow-gauge box trail carriage that could be broken down for transport on animal carts. Like its brother, it lacked a modern recoil system, using only an ineffective spring-mounted recoil spade, and was virtually obsolescent upon its introduction. Relatively few were made as the version of the standard 10 cm Feldhaubitze M 99 with a narrow,  carriage was cheaper.

References 
 Ortner, M. Christian. The Austro-Hungarian Artillery From 1867 to 1918: Technology, Organization, and Tactics. Vienna, Verlag Militaria, 2007 

World War I howitzers
Mountain artillery
World War I mountain artillery
World War I artillery of Austria-Hungary
104 mm artillery